The Moonstones are a set of nine carved sandstone memorials to various members of the Lunar Society. Made in 1998, and unveiled in March 1999, they can be viewed in the grounds of the Asda supermarket in Queslett, Great Barr, Birmingham, England. They are visible from the highway, when travelling from Aldridge Road into Queslett Road, toward the Scott Arms, and face outwards from the supermarket.

They depict nine members of the Society and attributes connected with their work, in order from Aldridge Road round to Queslett Road:

Josiah Wedgwood: portrait and three women from a jasperware design
Erasmus Darwin: portrait and design for horizontal windmill
Samuel Galton: colour wheel
William Murdock:  steam road locomotive
Matthew Boulton: medal with his portrait
James Watt: portrait and steam engine
Joseph Priestley: laboratory equipment
James Keir: crystals
William Withering: foxglove, with words from his book An Account of the Foxglove and some of its Medical Uses

The stones also each have a phase of the moon carved on them, with the Watt stone being the full moon.

The designs are by Steve Field and were executed by two stonemasons, Malcolm Sier and Michael Scheurmann. The rear of the Watt stone includes a carved panel crediting the artists and sponsors.

Great Barr Hall, Galton's home and a venue for meetings of the Lunar Society, is nearby.

See also
 Science and invention in Birmingham

External links

 Photos of the Moonstones on Flickr

Lunar Society of Birmingham
Sculptures in Birmingham, West Midlands
Tourist attractions in Birmingham, West Midlands
Monuments and memorials in Birmingham, West Midlands
Great Barr